Benjamin Franklin Grauer (June 2, 1908 – May 31, 1977) was a US radio and TV personality, following a career during the 1920s as a child actor in films and on Broadway. He began his career as a child in David Warfield's production of The Return of Peter Grimm. Among his early credits were roles in films directed by D.W. Griffith.

Grauer was born in Staten Island, New York. After graduating from Townsend Harris High School, he received his B.A. from the City College of New York in 1930. Grauer started in radio as an actor but soon became part of the broadcasting staff at the National Broadcasting Company. He was one of the four narrators, along with Burgess Meredith, of NBC's public affairs series The Big Story, which focused on courageous journalists.

In 1954, he married interior designer Melanie Kahane.

Radio
Grauer's greatest fame lies in his legendary 40-year career in radio. In 1930, the 22-year-old Benjamin Franklin Grauer joined the staff at NBC. He quickly rose through the ranks to become a senior commentator and reporter. He was the designated announcer for the popular 1940s Walter Winchell's Jergens Journal. Perhaps, most importantly, he was selected by Arturo Toscanini to become the voice of the NBC Symphony Orchestra. Grauer took over as announcer in late 1942, and remained until the orchestra was disbanded in June 1954. Toscanini said he was his favorite announcer.

Grauer did both the Toscanini radio and TV broadcasts. Several years after the death of Toscanini, Grauer and composer Don Gillis (who produced the NBC programs from 1947 to 1954), created the Peabody Award-winning radio series Toscanini, the Man Behind the Legend. It began in 1963 and continued through the centennial of Toscanini's birth in 1967. This series ran for nearly two decades on NBC Radio and then other radio stations until the early 1980s.

Starting in 1932, Grauer covered the Olympic Games, presidential inaugurations and international events. During his radio career, Grauer covered nearly every major historic event, including the Morro Castle fire, the Paris Peace Conference and the US occupation of Japan. Millions remember his NBC coverage of the New Year's celebrations on both radio and TV. Between 1939 and 1972, Grauer covered these events 34 times live from New York's Times Square. He continued covering New Year's Eve for Guy Lombardo's New Year's Eve specials on CBS in the mid-1970s, with his last appearance on December 31, 1976, the year before both he and Lombardo died. From the mid-1950s until the early-1970s, Grauer's reports were part of the NBC television network's The Tonight Show, where he worked with Johnny Carson and prior to that, Jack Paar, and Steve Allen. Grauer was also one of NBC Radio's Monitor "Communicators" from 1955 to 1960.

Grauer also was one of five hosts/narrators of "The First Fabulous Fifty", a five-part NBC Radio Network documentary series on the history of the network, featuring soundbites from past NBC programs. The series was broadcast on the occasion of the network's 50th anniversary in the autumn of 1976. Grauer narrated the first installment, which covered the network's first decade on the air, 1926 through 1936.

Television

Grauer provided the commentary for NBC's first television special, the opening in 1939 of the New York World's Fair. In 1948, Grauer, working with anchor John Cameron Swayze, provided the first extensive live network TV coverage of the national political conventions.

For five months in 1950, Grauer was host of The Ben Grauer Show, an NBC talk show that focused on books and their authors.

In 1954, NBC began broadcasting some of their shows in living color, and in 1957, the animated Peacock logo made its debut. It was Grauer who first spoke the now famous words, "The following program is brought to you in living color on NBC", behind the Peacock graphic. During his 40-year broadcast career, he hosted numerous TV programs on NBC, including game shows, quiz shows, concerts and news programs.

Reissues
It is for announcing the Toscanini radio concerts that Grauer is best known to modern classical music buffs. Several CD reissues have included those announcements to give the listener the feeling of hearing the NBC Symphony broadcasts exactly as they sounded when first aired. However, on the videocassettes and DVD's of Toscanini's television concerts, Grauer's voice has been replaced by that of Martin Bookspan. This was done because the music tracks now heard are not taken from the actual 1948-52 television audio, which was  very inferior, but from live, hi-fi magnetic tape sound recordings made of these same concerts at the studio. They are exactly synchronized to the visual images so that it now appears that these programs were made with high-fidelity sound. In order to maintain a complete illusion of superior sound, the announcements had to be redone; the difference in audio quality between Grauer's announcements and the music tracks as they are now heard would have been blatantly obvious.

An archival recording of Grauer's voice calling, "Here it is," begins Harry Shearer's Le Show.

Final years and death
In the decade before his death, Grauer collected material for a projected history of prices and pricing, with special attention to book prices. He was active in several professional journalistic organizations as well as the Grolier Club. Grauer had a strong interest in the graphic arts; he even printed his own Christmas cards.

Ben Grauer died of a heart attack at New York University Medical Center in New York City on May 31, 1977, two days before his 69th birthday. He is interred in Westchester Hills Cemetery in Hastings-on-Hudson, New York.

Filmography
Including early career as child actor:
 His Woman (1919)
 Mad Woman (1919)
 The Idol Dancer (1920) .... as Native Boy (film directed by D.W. Griffith)
 Annabel Lee (1921) .... David Martin, as a child
 The Town That Forgot God (1922) .... as a boy
 My Friend the Devil (1922) .... George Dryden, as a boy
 Does It Pay? (1923)
 Gaslight Follies (1945) .... Narrator, 'Stars of Yesterday'
 Fight of the Wild Stallions (1947) .... Narrator
 Kon-Tiki (1950) (voice) .... Narrator

Radio creditsThe Coca-Cola Top-Notchers (1930)Thrills Of Tomorrow For Boys (1933)The Baker's Broadcast (1934)The Fleischmann's Yeast Hour (1934)Radio City Matinee (1935)The Nellie Revell Show (1935)Ripley's Believe It Or Not (1935)Circus Night In Silvertown (1935)Lux Radio Theatre (1935)The Magic Key of RCA (1935)Paul Whiteman's Musical Varieties (1936)The Shell Show (1937)Shell Chateau (1937)The Fact Finder  (1937)The Royal Desserts Program (1938)Walter Winchell (1938)Pulitzer Prize Plays (1938)Battle of the Sexes (1938) NBC quiz.Pot o' Gold (1939–41) Considered the first "interactive" broadcast program. A popular game show hosted by Grauer.Horace Heidt and his Musical Knights played while Grauer asked listeners questions on the phone.It was this program that introduced the catchphrase "Stop the music".Richard Himber and His Orchestra (1939)The Vitalis Program (1939)H.V. Kaltenborn (1940)News Roundup (1940)Behind the Mike (1940)The News From Europe (1941)Sunday Evening News Roundup (1941)NBC Sunday News Roundup (1941)Jergens Journal (1941)The Hemisphere Review (1941)Two Years Of War (1941)Kay Kyser's Kollege of Musical Knowledge (1941)The March Of Time (1941)Radio City Music Hall On the Air (1942)Music Of the New World (1943)Mr. and Mrs. North (1943)Information, Please! (1943) NBC quiz showThe Fitch Bandwagon (1943)Your Home Front Reporter (1943)General Motors Symphony Of the Air (1943)Treasury Salute (1944)Opening Of the Fourth War Loan (1944)NBC D-Day Coverage (1944)Republican National Convention (1944)Democratic National Convention (1944)We Came This Way (1944)Liberation (1944)The Harold Lloyd Comedy Theatre (1945)V-E Day Coverage (1945)Atlantic Spotlight (1945) Grauer would chat across the Atlantic Ocean with BBC announcer in London.The Charlie McCarthy Show (1945)It's Alec Templeton Time (1946)A Story For V-J Day (1946)Echoes Of A Century (1947)Home Is What You Make It (1947)Here's To Veterans (1947)Housing 1947 (1947)The Chesterfield Supper Club (1948)Living 1948 (1948)Author Meets the Critics (1948)March Of Dimes (1949)The Henry Morgan Show (1949)Could Be (1949)The People Act (1950)We Can Do It (1950)The Phil Harris-Alice Faye Show (1950)Memo For Americans (1951)The Big Show (1951)Theatre Guild On the Air (1951)Living 1951 (1951)American Portraits (1951)The Endless Frontier (1952)The Forty Million (1952)Medicine U.S.A. (1953)Biography In Sound (1955)Best Of All (1955)Monitor (1955–1960) NBC Radio weekend radio showX Minus One (1956)Recollections At Thirty (1956)Sleep No More (1956–57) NBC Radio dramaThe Boston Pops (1957)Johnny Presents (1959)Meet the Press (1959)Democracy In America (1962)New Year's Eve All-Star Parade Of Bands (1968)The First Fabulous 50 (1976)What Would You Have Done? NBC Radio drama

These are found at Digital Deli Too.

TV creditsAmericana (1947–1949) American History quiz show. NBC-TVThe Ben Grauer Show, You Are an Artist, Learn to Draw (1950)The Big Story (1949–57) dramatic TV anthology. NBC-TVEyewitness (1947–48) Series that traced the history and development of TV itself. NBC-TVIn Town Today (1951)  RCA variety specials included Bob Hope and other stars showing off their new TV sets. NBC-TVIt's a Problem (1951–52) A trio of experts discuss everyday living difficulties. NBC-TVKay Kyser's Kollege of Musical Knowledge (1949–50) Popular musical quiz show hosted by Grauer. NBC-TVLewisohn Stadium Concerts (1950) Featuring the New York Philharmonic. NBC-TVMarch of Medicine (1958) Medical documentary series. NBC-TVThe Sacco-Vanzetti Story (1960) TV miniseries narrated by Grauer.Say It with Acting (1949–1952) Teams from Broadway shows play charades.Tactic (1959) NBC-TV series. Guests included Alfred Hitchcock and William Shatner.What Happened (1952) Panelists had to find out why each guest was important on this NBC-TV series.

Listen to
Ben Grauer announces for Arturo Toscanini and the  NBC Symphony. Listen to this complete and historic WWII broadcast and view a photo of Ben Grauer

References

Bibliography
 Holmstrom, John. The Moving Picture Boy: An International Encyclopedia from 1895 to 1995'', Norwich, Michael Russell, 1996, p. 35.

External links
Information about "Ben Grauer papers, 1915-1977" Collection at Columbia University
 Ben Grauer radio credits

American radio journalists
American radio reporters and correspondents
American male journalists
Burials at Westchester Hills Cemetery
Classical music radio presenters
NBC network announcers
People from Staten Island
Radio and television announcers
1908 births
1977 deaths
City College of New York alumni
Townsend Harris High School alumni